Horizon Fuel Cell Technologies is a manufacturer of hydrogen fuel cells based in Singapore. Founded in 2003, the company manufactures micro-size to multi-kilowatt scale proton exchange membrane fuel cells. Additionally, it provides hydrogen storage and production methods including hydrolysis, electrolysis and steam reforming.

History

In 2004, Horizon launched its first PEM fuel cell stacks with a focus on a simplified self-humidified air-breathing architecture and began a series of design and development iterations that reduce fuel cell costs by several orders of magnitude.

In 2005, with the completion of a first low-cost single cell, Horizon Fuel Cell Technologies creates its first commercial micro-size fuel cell product, designed as a basic science experiment kit. Soon after, Horizon miniatures hydrogen fuel cell car together with a real-working solar hydrogen station, and launches the H-racer, which is named Transportation Best Invention of the year 2006 by Time and "One of 11 Coolest New Products On the Planet" by Business 2.0. This led to the progressive commercialization of over 30 energy-related science experiment products, and an alliance, in 2010, with 3D Classwork to promote greater environmental awareness for sustainable energy amongst students around the world in a joint program called Destination Zero Carbon.  In 2013, Horizon launches i-HUGO, its latest hydrogen car miniature merging an iOS-enabled remote control APP, Horizon's latest hybrid micro-fuel cell power systems, and a USB enabled hydrogen station.

In April 2007, Horizon's fuel cells are used to power the world's first unmanned zero-emission fuel cell powered jet-wing aircraft, and set a new FAI flight distance record in a 5 kg LAV developed by Cal state-LA backed by NASA and US Air Force Research Laboratory. In August, the 2007 Innovative Energy Technology Developer of the Year Award in the Asia Pacific region has been presented to Horizon Fuel Cell Technologies.

2008 sees the unveiling at the Consumer Electronics Show of a first on-demand hydrogen enabled portable fuel cell named HYDROPLANE representing the start of Horizon's chemical hydrolysis cartridge research and development.  Horizon also begins works on the world's lowest cost reversible metal hydride which led to the commercialization of Hydrostik cartridges.

Together with Hydrologist and a metal hydroxide charging station named Hydro fill, Horizon introduces a palm-size micro portable fuel cell USB power supply named Mintaka at the 2009 Consumer Electronics Show. It wins 2012 Gadget of the Year status for Gamekeeper and was acclaimed by renewable industry specialists. During the same year, and following a string of small Horizon-enabled fuel cell electric aircraft flight tests in the US and Europe, Horizon launches a separate subsidiary in Singapore named Horizon Energy Systems (HES), and in 2010 unveils a first 450th/kg battery alternative prototype named Aerospace. HES is now aiming to exceed 1,000Wh/kg with its latest on-demand hydrogen technologies.

In 2010, BOC (now part of Lind Group) introduced a Horizon-made 150 W portable fuel cell power supply named Rhymer which begins sales in the United Kingdom. It is used in a variety of low-energy, high-efficiency applications such as construction and railway maintenance – and increasingly in off-the-grid lighting projects.

In 2012, Horizon starts to work on hydrocarbon to hydrogen steam reforming, with a commercial product launch of stationary solutions planned in 2014.

2013 sees the launch of Hydro max VRLA battery charger for recreational vehicles and yachts, as well as Aquiline, a salable 200W-50 kW back-up power system for telecom, data centers, and security solutions. In January, the Fuel cell-powered H-Rover is unveiled at the Nuremberg International Toy Fair.

The Hydroplane is launched, representing a breakthrough 9%Wt hydrogen storage method.

Products

Horizon's technology platform has three main parts: PEM fuel cells (micro-fuel cells and stacks) and their materials, hydrogen supply (electrolysis, reforming, and hydrolysis) as well as hydrogen storage and pressure related devices. From this platform, stem several market-focused business units within the company, with their lines of commercial products.

Fuel cell stacks are offered in three ranges:
 standard off-the-shelf PEM fuel cell systems available from 10W to 5 kW, as well as customized fuel cell system configurations up to 150 kW;
 premium H-1000XP 1 kW stacks which has achieved a peak efficiency of 59% during real test with one of the teams at Shell Eco-Marathon in Asia;
 Ultra-light and compact Aerospace from 200W to 1,000W.

Educational products and kits. Started in 2005 with a toy car used to demonstrate a newly invented thin-film micro-fuel cell. In 2010, Horizon won an international tender to supply the US National Science Competition with a fast-moving fuel cell car kit used in a competitive racing format. This led to the start of Destination Zero Carbon, a global STEM education program. The South African Agency for Science and Technology and the National Research Foundation have put together a video about the importance of making Science fun to boost research. Horizon's H-CELL product is featured in the video. In May 2013, French Minister of Industry, Frédéric Cuvillier hands out the Saint Jo 24 hour race's trophy cup specially made for this challenge, which was to keep a hydrogen-powered car using rain water, with hydrolysis done by solar panels, working under competitive conditions for 24 hours non-stop. The winning car was powered by Horizon Fuel Cell. It was the first time that a hydrogen powered car finished the 24 hour race, a one-tenth replica of 24 Hours of Le Mans for radio-controlled car.

Portable fuel cells are designed to offer the benefit of long duration, clean electric power generation in various off-grid emergency situations. They are declined in:
Mintaka for cellphones, smartphones, GPS handhelds, Go-Pro type cameras or MP3 players
Hydroplane (50 kW - 100 kW), easy to carry anywhere, with no harmful emissions, quiet and with ready-to-use energy cartridges with unlimited storage life
Hydro max, a deep cycle battery capacity extender for recreational use (RV, yachting)

Stationary backup power are developed internally or with integrator and partners seeking to develop cost-effective solutions.

The transport division works closely with integration partners that cater both to the car industry (supplying fuel cells to the Riversimple Urban Car or Micro cab) and offers an Electric Bike Kit, a plug and play hydrogen fuel cell system designed to hybridism with existing electric bikes.

The aerospace division focuses on lightweight alternatives to batteries, where fuel cell systems combined with high performance hydrogen generators increase electric flight duration by several orders of magnitude. Early applications include wildlife poaching activity over large territories, pipeline monitoring, border patrol and geological surveys. A world record was set in 2007 with Paternoster, a 5 kW aircraft developed with Oklahoma State University and Calstate - it flew 120 km (78 miles) - beating the previous record of 50 miles set in Estonia in 2006 – consuming only 16 of the 64 grams of Hydrogen stored on board in a pressurized hydrogen tank, giving the aircraft a potential flight range of 500 km (310 miles).

References

External links 
Horizon Fuel Cell Technologies

Engineering companies of Singapore
Fuel cell manufacturers
Singaporean brands